The Waldfriedhof Dahlem (Dahlem forest cemetery) is a cemetery in Berlin, in the district of Steglitz-Zehlendorf on the edge of the Grunewald forest at Hüttenweg 47.  Densely planted with conifers and designed between 1931 and 1933 after the plans of Albert Brodersen, it is one of Berlin's more recent cemeteries.  Its graves include those of writers such as Gottfried Benn, composers such as Wolfgang Werner Eisbrenner and entertainers like Harald Juhnke, and put it among the so-called "Prominentenfriedhöfe" or celebrity cemeteries.

Graves of notable people 

 Karl Anton (1898–1979), film director and film producer
 Michael Ballhaus (1935–2017), cinematographer
 Antoinette Becker (1920–1998), writer
 Carl Heinrich Becker (1876–1933), orientalist and politician
 Gottfried Benn (1886–1956), poet
 Heinz Berggruen (1914–2007), art collector
 Frank Michael Beyer (1928–2008), composer
 Hans-Otto Borgmann (1901–1977), film composer
 Bully Buhlan (1924–1982), singer, actor
 Carl Correns (1864–1933), botanist
 Ernst von Delius (1912–1937), racecar driver
 Alexander Dinghas (1908–1974), mathematician
 Franz Dischinger (1887–1953), civil and structural engineer
 Blandine Ebinger (1899–1993), actress and chansonnière
 Karin Eickelbaum (1937–2004), actress 
 Carl Otto von Eicken (1873–1960), physician
 Adolf Erman (1854–1937), egyptologist and lexicographer
 Wolfgang Werner Eisbrenner (1908–1981), composer and conductor
 Friedrich Fedde (1873–1942), botanist
 Curth Flatow (1920–2011), dramatist and screenwriter
 Ernst Fraenkel (1898–1975), political scientist
 Roland Freisler (1893–1945), notorious chief judge of the Nazi People's Court. He is buried in his wife's family plot in an unmarked grave. Ironically, one of his victims, Ulrich Wilhelm Graf Schwerin von Schwanenfeld (see below), is also buried in the cemetery.
 Ludwig Fulda (1862–1939), playwright and translator
 Klaus Gysi (1912–1999), politician
 Ernst Hartert (1859–1933), ornithologist
 O.E. Hasse (1903–1978), actor
 Heinz Hentschke (1895–1970), actor, director and librettist
 Günter Herlitz (1913–2010), businessman (Herlitz stationery company)
 Klaus Höhne (1927–2006), actor
 Carl Hofer (1878–1955), painter
 Helene Jacobs (1906–1993), Resistor
 La Jana (1905–1940), dancer and actress
 Werner Janensch (1878–1969), paleontologist and geologist
 Harald Juhnke (1929–2005), actor and entertainer
 Josef Paul Kleihues (1933–2004), architect
 Friedrich Wilhelm Kopsch (1868–1955), anatomist
 Hilde Körber (1906–1969), actress
 Hans Christian Korting (1952–2012), dermatologist and medical researcher
 Robert H. Lochner (1918–2003), journalist
 Bobby E. Lüthge (1891–1964), screenwriter
 Wolfgang Lukschy (1905–1983), actor
 Marie-Elisabeth Lüders (1878–1966), politician
 Leny Marenbach (1907–1984), actress
 Arnold Marquis (1921–1990), actor
 Erich Mühsam (1878–1934), author and anarchist, murdered in Oranienburg concentration camp
 Zenzl Mühsam (1884–1962), anarchist
 Rudolf Nelson (1878–1960), composer and theatre director
 Hermann Noack (1895–1958), Art and bronze caster; gravestone with relief tablet based on a model by Ernst Barlach
 Bernd Rosemeyer (1909–1938), racecar driver, with his wife Elly Beinhorn, aviator
 Heinrich Sahm (1877–1939), mayor of Berlin and administrator of Free State of Danzig
 Günter Schabowski (1929–2015), politician of  East Germany
 Wolfgang Schleif (1912–1984), film director
 Karl Schmidt-Rottluff* (1884–1976), painter
 Walther Schreiber (1884–1958), mayor of Berlin
 Franz Schreker* (1878–1934), composer
 Ulrich Wilhelm Graf Schwerin von Schwanenfeld (1902–1944), resistor
 Renée Sintenis* (1888–1965), sculptress
 Werner Sombart* (1863–1941), sociologist
 Camilla Spira (1906–1997), actress
 Herbert Stass (1919–1999), actor
 Ilse Steppat (1917–1969), actress
 Ivan Stranski (1897–1979), Bulgarian physical chemist
 Käte Stresemann (1883–1970), wife of the German Chancellor, Foreign Minister and Nobel Peace Prize laureate Gustav Stresemann
 Erwin Stresemann* (1889–1972), zoologist
 Wolfgang Stresemann* (1904–1998), conductor and composer
 Wilhelm Tank (1888–1967), painter
 Georg Tappert (1880–1957), painter
 Günter Tembrock (1918–2011), zoologist
 Heinrich Tessenow* (1876–1950), architect
 Ilse Trautschold (1906–1991), actress and comedian
 Kurt Ulrich (1905–1967), film producer
 Alfred Vohrer (1914–1986), film director
 Fritz Arno Wagner (1884–1958), cinematographer
 William Wauer* (1866–1962), sculptor and film director
 Richard von Weizsäcker (1920–2015), politician, president
 Sybil Werden (1924–2007), actress and dancer
 Theodor Wiegand (1864–1936), archaeologist
 Heinz-Günter Wittmann (1927–1990), biochemist
 Jürgen Wolters (1940–2015), professor of econometrics
 Johannes Würtz (1875–1958), founder of the Behindertenpädagogik (grave is lost)

Bibliography 
 Hannelore Prüfer, Der Berliner Gartendirektor Albert Brodersen (1857–1930), in: Berlinische Monatsschrift, Heft 10/1997, Seiten 77/78 online at Edition Luisenstadt
 Klaus Hammer: Historische Friedhöfe & Grabmäler in Berlin, Stattbuch Verlag Berlin 1994,

External links

 List of burials at the Waldfriedhof Dahlem
 

Cemeteries in Berlin